The Immediate Geographic Region of São Francisco is one of the 7 immediate geographic regions in the Intermediate Geographic Region of Montes Claros, one of the 70 immediate geographic regions in the Brazilian state of Minas Gerais and one of the 509 of Brazil, created by the National Institute of Geography and Statistics (IBGE) in 2017.

Municipalities 
It comprises 6 municipalities.

 Chapada Gaúcha
 Icaraí de Minas
 Pintópolis
 São Francisco     
 São Romão     
 Ubaí

References 

Geography of Minas Gerais